Searby Buxton (20 February 1832 – 18 February 1919) was a 19th-century Member of Parliament in Canterbury, New Zealand and father of New Zealand politician Thomas Buxton.

He represented the  electorate from 1887 to 1890, when he was defeated in the Geraldine electorate by Arthur Rhodes. He represented the Liberal Opposition, and lost with 671 votes to Rhodes' 994, despite an Election Ballad eulogising him.

References

1832 births
1919 deaths
19th-century New Zealand politicians
Members of the New Zealand House of Representatives
New Zealand MPs for South Island electorates
Unsuccessful candidates in the 1890 New Zealand general election